Vũ Công Tuyền (born 17 May 1969) is a Vietnamese former international footballer who played as a forward. He was capped eight times in 2000, scoring nine goals.

Career statistics

International

International goals
Scores and results list Vietnam's goal tally first, score column indicates score after each Vietnam goal.

References

1969 births
Living people
Vietnamese footballers
Vietnam international footballers
Association football forwards
Viettel FC players